The 1919 California Golden Bears football team was an American football team that represented the University of California, Berkeley in the Pacific Coast Conference (PCC) during the 1919 college football season. In their fourth year under head coach Andy Smith, the team compiled a 6–2–1 record (2–2 against PCC opponents), finished in a tie for third place in the PCC, and outscored its opponents by a combined total of 147 to 64.

Schedule

References

California
California Golden Bears football seasons
California California Golden Bears football